Hexafluoroacetylacetone is the chemical compound with the nominal formula CF3C(O)CH2C(O)CF3 (often abbreviated as hfacH). This colourless liquid is a ligand precursor and a reagent used in MOCVD. The compound exists exclusively as the enol CF3C(OH)=CHC(O)CF3. For comparison under the same conditions, acetylacetone is  85% enol.

Metal complexes of the conjugate base exhibit enhanced volatility and Lewis acidity relative to analogous complexes derived from acetylacetone.
The visible spectra of bis(hexafluoroacetylacetonato)copper(II) and its dehydrate  have been reported in carbon tetrachloride. 
Compounds of the type bis(hexafluoroacetylacetonato)copper(II):Bn , where :B are Lewis bases such as N,N-dimethylacetamide, dimethyl sulfoxide, or pyridine and n = 1 or 2, have been prepared.  Since bis(hexafluoroacetylacetonato)copper(II) is soluble in carbon tetrachloride, its Lewis acid properties have been studied for 1:1 adducts using a variety of Lewis bases.

This organofluorine compound was first prepared by the condensation of ethyl ester of trifluoroacetic acid and 1,1,1-trifluoroacetone.  It has been investigated as an etchant for copper and its complexes, such as Cu(Hfac)(trimethylvinylsilane) have been employed as precursors in microelectronics.

Being highly electrophilic, hexafluoroacetylacetone is hydrated in water to give the tetraol.

References

Chelating agents
Diketones
Trifluoromethyl compounds
Enols
3-Hydroxypropenals